Fan Tin Tsuen is a village in the San Tin area of Yuen Long District, Hong Kong.

Administration
Fan Tin, including San Yi Cho and Ming Tak Tong, is a recognized village under the New Territories Small House Policy.

References

External links

 Delineation of area of existing village Fan Tin San Yi Cho (San Tin) for election of resident representative (2019 to 2022)
 Delineation of area of existing village Ming Tak Tong (San Tin) for election of resident representative (2019 to 2022)
 Antiquities and Monuments Office. Pamphlet about Man Lun Fung Ancestral Hall
 Antiquities and Monuments Office. Hong Kong Traditional Chinese Architectural Information System. Fan Tin Tsuen

Villages in Yuen Long District, Hong Kong
San Tin